The 1980 Christchurch mayoral election was part of the New Zealand local elections held that same year. In 1980, election were held for the Mayor of Christchurch plus other local government positions. The polling was conducted using the standard first-past-the-post electoral method.

Background
Incumbent Mayor Hamish Hay was re-elected with a decreased majority, defeating Labour city councillor Mollie Clark. Despite Hay retaining the mayoralty there was a huge swing against the Citizens' Association leaving the composition of the council at fifteen seats to four in favour of the Labour Party.

Results
The following table gives the election results:

Ward results
Candidates were also elected from wards to the Christchurch City Council.

References

Mayoral elections in Christchurch
1980 elections in New Zealand
Politics of Christchurch
October 1980 events in New Zealand
1980s in Christchurch